Ruby Myers (1907 – 10 October 1983), better known by her stage name Sulochana, was an Indian silent film actress of Jewish ancestry, from the community of Baghdadi Jews in India.

In her heyday she was one of the highest paid actresses of her time, when she was paired with Dinshaw Bilimoria in Imperial Studios films. In the mid-1930 she opened Rubi Pics, a film production house.

Myers was awarded the 1973 Dada Saheb Phalke Award, India's highest award in cinema for lifetime achievement. She adopted a girl and named her Sarah Myers who after marriage was called Vijaylaxmi Shreshtha. Myers died in Mumbai in 1983.

Film career

Ruby Myers was born in 1907 in Pune. The self-named Sulochana was among the early Eurasian female stars of Indian Cinema.

She was working as a telephone operator when she was approached by Mohan Bhavnani of Kohinoor Film Company to work in films. She initially turned him down as acting was regarded as quite a dubious profession for women those days. However Bhavnani persisted and she finally agreed, despite having no knowledge of acting. She became a star under Bhavnani's direction at Kohinoor before moving on to the Imperial Film Company where she became the highest paid movie star in the country.

Among her popular films were Typist Girl (1926), Balidaan (1927) and Wildcat of Bombay (1927).

Three romantic films in 1928-29 with director R.S. Chaudhari - Madhuri (1928), Anarkali (1928) and Indira B.A. (1929) saw her at her peak of fame in the silent film era. When a short film on Mahatma Gandhi inaugurating a khadi exhibition was shown, alongside it was added a popular dance of Sulochana's from Madhuri, synchronised with sound effects.

With the coming of sound, Sulochana found a lull in her career, as it now required an actor to be proficient in Hindustani. Taking a year off to learn the language, she made a comeback with the talkie version of Madhuri (1932).

Further talkie versions of her silent hits followed, with Indira (now an) M.A. (1934), Anarkali (1935) and Bombay ki Billi (1936). Sulochana was back with a bang. She was drawing a salary of Rs 5000 per month, she had the sleekest of cars (Chevrolet 1935) and one of the biggest heroes of the silent era, D. Billimoria, as her lover with whom she worked exclusively between 1933 and 1939. They were an extremely popular pair - his John Barrymore-style opposite her Oriental 'Queen of Romance' But once their love story ended so did their careers. Sulochana left Imperial to find few offers forthcoming. She tried making a comeback with character roles but even these were few.
 
However, she still had the power to excite controversy. In 1947, Morarji Desai banned Jugnu, because it showed the "morally reprehensible" act of an aging fellow professor falling for Sulochana's vintage charms.

In 1953, she acted in her third Anarkali, but this time in a supporting role as Salim's mother. Her films include Cinema Queen (1926), Typist Girl (1926), Balidaan (1927), Wild Cat of Bombay, in which she played eight different characters, which was remade as Bambai Ki Billi (1936); Madhuri (1928), which was re-released with sound in 1932; Anarkali (1928), remade in 1945; Indira BA (1929); Heer Ranjah (1929), and many others, such as Baaz (1953).

Sulochana established her own film studio, Rubi Pics, in the mid-1930s.  She received the Dada Saheb Phalke Award in 1973 for her lifetime contribution to Indian cinema. Ismail Merchant paid homage to her in Mahatma and the Bad Boy (1974).

She died in 1983 in her flat in Mumbai.

Selected filmography
 Cinema Queen (1926)
 Typist Girl (1926)
 Balidan (1927)
 Wildcat of Bombay (1927)
 Anarkali (1928)
 Heer Ranjah (1929)
 Indira BA (1929)
 Sulochana (1933)
 Shair (1949)
 Baaz (1953)
 Neel Kamal (1968)
 Mere Humdum Mere Dost (1968)
 Amrapali (1966)
 Julie (1975)
 Khatta Meetha (1978)

Further reading
 Great Masters of Indian Cinema: The Dadasaheb Phalke Award Winners, by D. P. Mishra, Publications Division, Ministry of Information and Broadcasting, Govt. of India, 2006. . page 16.
 Actress Sulochana Cinema at the End of Empire: A Politics of Transition in Britain And India, by Priya Jaikumar, Duke University Press, 2006. . Page 73.
 The Hundred Luminaries of Hindi Cinema, by Dinesh Raheja, Jitendra Kothari. India Book House Publishers, 1996. . page 1871

References

External links

 
 The Sirens of  the Silent Era - Sulochana (Ruby Myers)(1907-1983) Hindustan Times.

 Rare Picture: https://www.flickr.com/photos/rashid_ashraf/31671546322/in/dateposted/

1907 births
1983 deaths
Indian people of Iraqi-Jewish descent
Indian silent film actresses
Actresses in Hindi cinema
Indian Jews
Jewish actresses
Dadasaheb Phalke Award recipients
Actresses from Pune
20th-century Indian actresses
Actresses from Mumbai